The 1974–75 OMJHL season was the first season of the Ontario Major Junior Hockey League. The league operated semi-autonomously while still being part of the Ontario Hockey Association. The OMJHL inaugurated the William Hanley Trophy, awarded to the most sportsmanlike player. Eleven teams each played 70 games. The Toronto Marlboros won the J. Ross Robertson Cup, defeating the Hamilton Fincups.

League business
The Major Junior A Series of the Ontario Hockey Association (OHA) was rebranded as the Ontario Major Junior Hockey League (OMJHL) in 1974. The league began operating semi-autonomously from the OHA, and later became fully independent. Tubby Schmalz was appointed the first commissioner of the OMJHL on September 23, 1974.

Schmalz set about to implement a revised mandatory player contract. It included a clause in which 20 per cent of a player's earnings during his first three professional seasons would go back to the junior clubs to recuperate development costs. He explained that the clause was a result of Mark Howe and Marty Howe both departing in the summer for the Houston Aeros, and there was nothing in the OHA junior contract to cover development payments by professional teams. The new clause was a basis for potential legal action against the World Hockey Association (WHA) which had not made payments to the Canadian Amateur Hockey Association (CAHA) or OHA.

Schmalz confirmed in January 1975, that development payments from the National Hockey League (NHL) were coming, and that the WHA was holding a meeting in February to discuss the issue. WCHL president Ed Chynoweth said his league's governors agreed to withdraw from the CAHA if the payment issue was not resolved, and foretold the possibility of Canada's three major junior leagues banding together under one umbrella. The NHL and WHA were delinquent in $600,000 in payments as per the existing professional-amateur agreement. The Winnipeg Free Press reported that the WCHL was negotiating a separate deal with the WHA for development fees, and the WCHL would break away from the CAHA after the 1975 Memorial Cup. Schmalz was angered at the report and called for the three major junior league to remain unified.

In February 1975, the NHL and the WHA agreed to stop drafting underage junior players. Mark Napier of the Toronto Marlboros who was not drafted, signed a professional contract with the Toronto Toros later that month to take effect in the following season. Schmalz stated he would seek legal advice on the matter, with the possibility of suspending Napier for the remainder of the junior season. During a game against the Marlboros, St. Catharines Black Hawks owner Hap Emms ordered his players to wear their jerseys backwards and play with their sticks upside down in protest of Napier's contract. Schmalz later ruled Napier eligible to play, and suspended Emms for the remainder of the season and fined him $1,000.

Regular season

Standings

Scoring leaders

Playoffs

Quarterfinals

Toronto Marlboros defeat Kingston Canadians 4–3, 1 tie

Peterborough Petes defeat Oshawa Generals 4–1

Hamilton Fincups defeat St. Catharines Black Hawks 4–0

Sudbury Wolves defeat Ottawa 67's 4–3

Semifinals

Toronto Marlboros defeat Sudbury Wolves 4–3, 1 tie

Hamilton Fincups defeat Peterborough Petes 4–2

J. Ross Robertson Cup

Toronto Marlboros defeat Hamilton Fincups 4–3

Awards

See also
List of OHA Junior A standings
List of OHL seasons
1975 Memorial Cup
1975 NHL Entry Draft
1974 in sports
1975 in sports

References

External links
HockeyDB

Ontario Hockey League seasons
OMJHL